The Sierra Leone River is a river estuary on the Atlantic Ocean in Western Sierra Leone. It is formed by the Bankasoka River and Rokel River and is between 4 and 10 miles wide (6–16 km) and 25 miles (40 km) long. It holds the major ports of Queen Elizabeth II Quay and Pepel. The estuary is also important for shipping. It is the largest natural harbour in the African continent. Several islands, including Tasso Island (the largest), Tombo Island, and the historically important Bunce Island, are located in the estuary.

Lungi International Airport

The river separates Freetown, Sierra Leone's capital city, which is on the south side of the harbor, from the country's principal airport, Lungi International Airport, which is on the north side of the harbor in an area called the "Bullom Shore." The primary means of transportation from the airport to Freetown are by speed boat or ferry. Hovercraft, or helicopter services are no longer running.

Ecology
The  of the Sierra Leone River estuary is classified as a wetland of international importance Ramsar Convention in the west of Sierra Leone. The area is mainly mangrove swamps but also includes tidal freshwater swamp forests.

References

See also
 Protected areas of Sierra Leone
 Ramsar list of wetlands of international importance

Rivers of Sierra Leone
Geography of Freetown
Protected areas of Sierra Leone
Ramsar sites in Sierra Leone